Stalcup may refer to:
Jack Staulcup
Jack Staulcup Orchestra
Mary Stalcup Markward
Wilbur Stalcup
Jerry Stalcup

See also
Stalcup Corner, Indiana